The Distance Between Us and the Sky is a 2019 Greek-French short film written and directed by Vasilis Kekatos. It won the Short Film Palme d'Or at the 2019 Cannes Film Festival.

Plot
Two strangers meet for the first time at an old gas station. One has stopped to gas up his bike, while the other is just stranded. Lacking the €22.50 he needs to get home, he will try to sell him the distance that separates them from the sky.

Cast
Nikos Zeginoglou as Boy 1
Ioko Ioannis Kotidis as Boy 2

Reception
The film was awarded the Short Film Palme d'Or at the 2019 Cannes Film Festival It also won the Short Film Queer Palm.

References

External links
 

2019 films
Short Film Palme d'Or winners
2019 short films
Films set in 2019
Greek short films
Greek LGBT-related films
French LGBT-related films
French short films
LGBT-related short films